Adamowice  (German Adamowitz) is a village in the administrative district of Gmina Strzelce Opolskie, within Strzelce County, Opole Voivodeship, in south-western Poland.

The village has a population of 411.

References

Adamowice